Democrat Turkey Party (DTP) is a former political party in Turkey,

The party was founded by a group of MPs issued from the True Path Party on 7 January 1997. The chairman of the party was Hüsamettin Cindoruk, who was a former chairman of the True Path Party. The party participated in the coalition government of Mesut Yılmaz (30 June 1997 – 11 January 1999). In the 1999 elections they received less than 1% of the vote. Hüsamettin Cindoruk resigned. In later years they tried to survive with different chairmen and names and in 2008 the party decided to merge with the People's Ascent Party.

References

Defunct conservative parties in Turkey
Liberal conservative parties in Turkey
Political parties established in 1997
Political parties disestablished in 2008
1997 establishments in Turkey
2008 disestablishments in Turkey